Peter Emil Isler (31 January 1851 – 10 March 1936) was a Swiss politician and President of the Swiss Council of States (1904/1905).

External links 
 
 

1851 births
1936 deaths
Members of the Council of States (Switzerland)
Presidents of the Council of States (Switzerland)